San Sebastián Formation may refer to:
 San Sebastián Limestone, an Oligocene geologic formation in Puerto Rico
 San Sebastián Formation, Peru, a Late Pleistocene geologic formation in Peru
 Cape Sebastián Sandstone, a Campanian geologic formation in Oregon